In mathematics in complex analysis, the concept of holomorphic separability is a measure of the richness of the set of holomorphic functions on a complex manifold or complex-analytic space.

Formal definition

Often one says the holomorphic functions  separate points.

Usage and examples
A holomorphically separable complex manifold is not compact unless it is discrete and finite.
The condition is part of the definition of a Stein manifold.

Reference 

Complex analysis
Several complex variables